The first millennium of the anno Domini or Common Era was a millennium spanning the years 1 to 1000 (1st to 10th centuries; in astronomy: JD  – ). The world population rose more slowly than during the preceding millennium, from about 200 million in the year AD 1 to about 300 million in the year 1000.    

In Western Eurasia (Europe and Near East), the first millennium was a time of great transition from Classical Antiquity to the Middle Ages. The 1st century saw the peak of the Roman Empire, followed by its gradual decline during the period of Late Antiquity, the rise of Christianity and the Great Migrations. The second half of the millennium is characterized as the Early Middle Ages in Europe, and marked by the Viking expansion in the west, the rise of the Byzantine Empire in the east.

In East Asia, the first millennium was also a time of great cultural advances, notably the spread of Buddhism to East Asia. In China, the Han dynasty is replaced by the Jin dynasty and later the Tang dynasty until the 10th century sees renewed fragmentation in the Five Dynasties and Ten Kingdoms period. In Japan, a sharp increase in population followed when farmers' use of iron tools increased their productivity and crop yields. The Yamato court was established. The North Indian subcontinent was divided among numerous kingdoms throughout the first millennium, until the formation of the Gupta Empire. Islam expanded rapidly from Arabia to western Asia, India, North Africa and the Iberian peninsula, culminating in the Islamic Golden Age (700–1200).

In Mesoamerica, the first millennium was a period of enormous growth known as the Classic Era (200–900). Teotihuacan grew into a metropolis and its empire dominated Mesoamerica. In South America, pre-Incan, coastal cultures flourished, producing impressive metalwork and some of the finest pottery seen in the ancient world.
In North America, the Mississippian culture rose at the end of the millennium in the Mississippi and Ohio river valleys. Numerous cities were built; Cahokia, the largest, was based in present-day Illinois.  The construction of Monks Mound at Cahokia was begun in 900–950.

In Sub-Saharan Africa, the Bantu expansion reaches Southern Africa by about the 5th century.
The trans Saharan slave trade spans the Sahara and the Swahili coast by the 9th century.

Civilizations, kingdoms and dynasties

Events
The events in this section are organized according to the United Nations geoscheme

Inventions, discoveries, introductions

Centuries and decades

References

 
Millennia